Club Deportivo Ciudad de Vícar is a football team based in Vícar. Founded in 2007, it holds its home matches at Estadio Municipal de Vícar.

History
CD Ciudad de Vícar was founded in 2007 after a seat exchange with CF Huercalense. CF Huercalense finally disappeared and the newly created club began in Tercera División (Third Division).
Ciudad Vícar withdrew from Tercera División in February 2012, due to not having enough players to fulfil the lineups.

Season to season

4 seasons in Tercera División

Current squad (some players)

Former players
 Josep Antoni Gomes (2010)
 Gregorio (2009–2010)

References

External links
Futbolme team profile 

Football clubs in Andalusia
Association football clubs established in 2007
Divisiones Regionales de Fútbol clubs
2007 establishments in Spain